The Fund Processing Passport (FPP), developed by the European Fund and Asset Management Association (EFAMA), is a fully harmonized document with all the key "operational" information that fund promoters should provide on their investment funds in order to facilitate their trading.

Definition
The information covered includes ISIN code, contact details, subscriptions/redemptions rules, settlement details, cut off times, etc.

History
The FPSG published its first set of recommendations in February 2005. An updated report was published in September 2008. This report consolidates the 2005 recommendations and extends them in three service areas: holding and transaction reporting, commission handling and settlement cycles.

In early 2007, EFAMA published the version 1.0 of the Fund Processing Passport, which had been outlined in the FPSG recommendations of 2005. To highlight the rationale for the FPP, EFAMA published a brochure in June 2007. In May 2008, EFAMA released a revised and improved version of the FPP, together with an updated version of its User Guide and formatting guidelines (see "Fund Processing Passport User Guide", version 2.0, Excel file)

EFAMA strongly believes that the FPSG recommendations, if embraced by the industry, will serve to converge towards industry-wide standards, thereby removing an important barrier to the development of harmonized processing of investment fund transactions in Europe.

External links
 More information Efama

Investment funds